Paul Menzel is an American actor, writer, producer, and business consultant in Houston, Texas.

He began his career by organizing a comedy troupe while a student at Carleton College in Northfield, Minnesota. After graduation, he was performer and writer at Dudley Riggs' Brave New Workshop in Minneapolis.

Later, Menzel founded the Comedy Workshops in Houston and Austin, Texas. He founded, with Layton Payne, Business Stages, a consultancy which uses acting and improvisational exercises to teach management and cooperative skills.

Filmography

External links

Carleton College alumni
American male film actors
Living people
Year of birth missing (living people)